There is considerable confusion in both Chinese and foreign sources over definitions of urban places and hence considerable variation in estimates of China's urban population (see Migration in China).

The problem of determining the size of the urban population reflects inconsistent and changing administrative categories; the distinction between rural and urban household registry and between categories of settlements; the practice of placing suburban or rural districts under the administration of municipal governments; and the differences in the status accorded to small towns. In sociological terms, urban refers to an area characterized by a relatively high degree of specialization in occupational roles, many special-purpose institutions, and uniform treatment of people in impersonal settings. In this sense, a Chinese market town is more urban than a village, and settlements become more urban as they grow in size and economic complexity. Municipalities like Beijing and Shanghai have the highest degree of division of labor and the most specialized institutions.

Distinctive features
Legal status as an urban dweller in China is prized. As a result of various state policies and practices, contemporary Chinese urban society has a distinctive character, and life in Chinese cities differs in many ways from that in cities in otherwise comparable developing societies. The most consequential policies have been the household registration system, the legal barriers to migration, the fostering of the all-embracing work unit, and the restriction of commerce and markets, including the housing market. In many ways, the weight of official control and supervision is felt more in the cities, whose administrators are concerned with controlling the population and do so through a dual administrative hierarchy. The two principles on which these control structures are based are locality and occupation. Household registers are maintained by the police, whose presence is much stronger in the cities than in the countryside (see Public Security Bureau). Cities have been subdivided into districts, wards, and finally into small units of some fifteen to thirty households, such as all those in one apartment building or on a small lane. For those employed in large organizations, the work unit either is coterminous with the residential unit or takes precedence over it; for those employed in small collective enterprises or neighborhood shops, the residential committee is their unit of registration and provides a range of services.

The control of housing by work units and local governments and the absence of a housing market have led to a high degree of residential stability. Most urban residents have spent decades in the same house or apartment. For this reason, urban neighborhoods are closely knit, which in turn contributes to the generally low level of crime in Chinese cities.

Since the early 1950s, the party leadership has consistently made rapid industrialization a primary goal and, to this end, has generally favored investment in heavy industry over consumption. For cities, these policies have meant an expansion of factories and industrial employment, along with a very low level of spending in such "nonproductive" areas as housing or urban transit systems. The emphasis on production, and heavy industry and the discouragement of consumption and exchange, along with state takeovers of commerce and the service sector, led to cities having many factories but no peddlers, snack stalls, or entertainment districts. In the 1950s and early 1960s, major efforts were made to bring women into the paid labor force. This served the goals of increasing production and achieving sexual equality through equal participation in productive labor, a classic Marxist remedy for sexual inequality. By 1987 almost all young and middle-aged women in the cities worked outside the home.

Chinese cities, in contrast to those in many developing countries, contain a high proportion of workers in factories and offices and a low proportion of workers in the service sector. Workers enjoy a high level of job security but receive low wages. Between 1963 and 1977 most wages were frozen, and promotions and raises were very rare. Even with the restoration of material incentives in the late 1970s, two general wage raises in the 1980s, and increased opportunities for bonuses and promotions, wages remained low and increased primarily with seniority. As in most parts of the world, one reason that so many Chinese urban women are in the work force is that one income is not enough to support a family.

In the 1980s it was possible to purchase such consumer durables as television sets and bicycles on the market, but housing remained scarce and subject to allocation by work units or municipal housing bureaus. Although housing was poor and crowded, Chinese neighborhoods had improved greatly over the slum conditions that existed before 1950. Most people were gainfully employed at secure if low-paying jobs; the municipal government provided a minimal level of services and utilities (water and sanitation); the streets were fairly clean and orderly; and the crime rate was low.

Housing
Chinese urban dwellers, as a category, receive subsidies on food, housing, and transportation services. In the 1980s such subsidies came to occupy an increasingly large share of the state budget. Even with subsidies, food purchases took the largest share of household budgets. Rents, in contrast, were very low, seldom taking more than 5 percent of household income even with water and electricity charges included. Little new housing was built between 1950 and 1980, and although more urban housing was erected between 1980 and 1985 than in the previous thirty years, housing remained in short supply. Entire families often lived in one room and shared cooking and toilet facilities with other families. Marriages were sometimes delayed until housing became available from the municipal office or the work unit. Young people were expected to live with their parents at least until marriage. This was consonant with traditional family patterns but was also reinforced by the shortage of housing. The pattern of long-term residential stability and great pressure on the stock of available housing meant that city neighborhoods were less stratified by occupation or income than those of many other countries. Not only were incomes more egalitarian to begin with, but more money could not buy a bigger or better equipped apartment. Managers and technical specialists lived under much the same conditions as manual workers, often in the same buildings. While many urban families enjoyed higher real incomes in the 1980s, they usually could not translate those incomes into better housing, as peasants could.

Until recently, housing was provided by an individual's work unit in the form of a one or two bedroom apartment. In the 1990s, a private housing market began to develop, leading to numerous xiaoqu (lit. "small zones") springing up in the cities. These areas had newly furnished apartments and town houses. Large-sized houses, colloquially termed "mansions" (bieshu) in the Chinese language, is a rather new concept and is usually only available to the business elite.

The combination of full adult employment with a minimal service sector put heavy burdens on urban households. By the 1980s both the public and the government recognized the burdens on urban households and the associated drain on the energies of workers, managers, and professionals. After 1985 more money was budgeted for housing and such municipal services as piped-in cooking gas. But state encouragement of the private or collective service sector had greater effect. Unemployed urban youth were permitted and sometimes advised to set up small restaurants or service establishments. Peasants were permitted to come into cities to sell produce or local products. Municipal authorities seemed to ignore the movement of substantial numbers of rural people into the urban service sector as peddlers, carpenters, and other skilled workers or, occasionally, as domestic workers. In the mid-1980s the Chinese press reported an influx of teenage girls from the country seeking short-term work as housekeepers or nannies. Like other rural migrants, they usually used ties with relatives or fellow villagers resident in the city to find positions.

Families and marriage
Urban families differ from their rural counterparts primarily in being composed largely of wage earners who look to their work units for the housing, old-age security, and opportunities for a better life that in the countryside are still the responsibility of the family. With the exception of those employed in the recently revived urban service sector (restaurants, tailoring, or repair shops) who sometimes operate family businesses, urban families do not combine family and enterprise in the manner of peasant families. Urban families usually have multiple wage earners, but children do not bring in extra income or wages as readily as in the countryside. Urban families are generally smaller than their rural counterparts, and, in a reversal of traditional patterns, it is the highest level managers and cadres who have the smallest families. Late marriages and one or two children are characteristic of urban managerial and professional groups. As in the past, elite family forms are being promoted as the model for everyone.

Three-generation families are not uncommon in cities, and a healthy grandparent is probably the ideal solution to the childcare and housework problems of most families. About as many young children are cared for by a grandparent as are enrolled in a work unit nursery or kindergarten, institutions that are far from universal. Decisions on where a newly married couple is to live often depend on the availability of housing. Couples most often establish their own household, frequently move in with the husband's parents, or, much less often, may move in with the wife's parents. Both the state and the society expect children to look after their aged parents. In addition, a retired worker from a state enterprise will have a pension and often a relatively desirable apartment as well. Under these circumstances elderly people are assets to a family. Those urban families employing unregistered maids from the countryside are most likely those without healthy grandparents.

Families play less of a role in marriage choices in cities than in the countryside, at least in part because the family itself is not the unit promising long-term security and benefits to its members. By the late 1970s, perhaps half of all urban marriages were the result of introductions by workmates, relatives, or parents. The marriage age in cities has been later than that in the countryside, which reflects greater compliance with state rules and guidelines as well as social and economic factors common to many other countries. People in cities and those with secondary and postsecondary education or professional jobs tend to marry later than farmers. In China it was felt that marriage was appropriate only for those who have jobs and thus are in a position to be full members of society. Peasant youth, who have an automatic claim on a share of the collective fields and the family house, qualified, but college students or urban youths who are "waiting for assignment" to a lifetime job did not. In any case, work unit approval was necessary for marriage.

Urban weddings were usually smaller and more subdued than their rural counterparts, which reflected the diminished role of the families in the process. Families often reserve a restaurant and a wedding ceremony troupe, which includes a wedding host and entertainers. More guests will be coworkers or friends of the bride and groom than distant kin or associates of the parents. The wedding ceremony focuses on the bride and groom as a couple rather than on their status as members of families. Similarly, a brief honeymoon trip rather than a three-day celebration in which the entire village plays a part is an increasingly common practice. Long engagements are common in cities, sometimes because the couple is waiting for housing to become available.

Providing for the next generation
Although Chinese families continue to be marked by respect for parents and a substantial degree of filial piety, parents have weighty obligations toward their children as well. Children are obliged to support parents in their old age, and parents are obliged to give their children as favorable a place in the world as they can in the early phase of their life. In the past this meant leaving them property and providing the best education or training possible. For most rural parents today the choice of a career for their children is not a major issue. Most children of peasants will be peasants like their parents, and the highest realistic ambition is a position as a low-level cadre or teacher or perhaps a technician. The primary determinant of a rural child's status and well-being remains his or her family, which is one reason for the intense concern with the marriage choices of sons and daughters and for the greater degree of parental involvement in those decisions.

Urban parents are less concerned with whom their children marry but are more concerned with their education and eventual careers. Urban parents can expect to leave their children very little in the way of property, but they do their best to prepare them for secure and desirable jobs in the state and commercial sectors. The difficulty is that such jobs are limited, competition is intense, and the criteria for entry have changed radically several times since the early 1950s. Many of the dynamics of urban society revolve around the issue of job allocation and the attempts of parents in the better-off segments of society to transmit their favored position to their children. The allocation of scarce and desirable goods, in this case jobs, is a political issue and one that has been endemic since the late 1950s. These questions lie behind the changes in educational policy, the attempts in the 1960s and 1970s to settle urban youth in the countryside, the upheaval of the Cultural Revolution, and the post-1980 encouragement of small-scale private and collective commerce and service occupations in the cities. All are attempts to solve the problem, and each attempt has its own costs and drawbacks.

Opportunities and competition
Cities, by definition, are places with a high degree of occupational specialization and division of labor. They are places offering their inhabitants a range of occupational choice and also, to the degree that some occupations are seen as better than others, competition for the better occupations. Cities also provide the training for specialized occupations, either in schools or on the job.

In China there is a cultural pattern stressing individual achievement and upward mobility. These are best attained through formal education and are bound up with the mutual expectations and obligations of parents and children. There is also a social structure in which a single, bureaucratic framework defines desirable positions, that is, managerial or professional jobs in the state or private sectors or secure jobs in factories. Restricted migration, lifetime employment, egalitarian wage structures, and the insular nature of work units were intended by the state, at least in part, to curtail individual competition. Nevertheless, some jobs have been still seen as preferable to others, and it is urbanites and their children who have the greatest opportunities to compete for scarce jobs. The question for most families is how individuals are selected and allocated to those positions. The lifetime tenure of most jobs and the firm control of job allocation by the party make these central issues for parents in the favored groups and for local authorities and party organizations.

Between the early 1950s and mid-1980s, policies on recruitment of personnel and their allocation to desirable jobs changed several times. As the costs and drawbacks of each method became apparent, pressure mounted to change the policy. In the early and mid-1950s, the problem was not acute. State offices were expanding rapidly, and there were more positions than people qualified to fill them. Peasants moved into cities and found employment in the expanding industrial sector. Most of those who staffed the new bureaucratic sectors were young and would not begin to retire until the 1980s and 1990s. Those who graduated from secondary schools or universities, however, or were discharged from the armed forces in the late 1950s and early 1960s found few jobs of the sort they were qualified for or had expected to hold.

Attempts to manage the competition for secure jobs were among the many causes of the radical, utopian policies of the period from 1962 to 1976. Among these, the administrative barriers erected between cities and countryside and the confinement of peasants and their children to their villages served to diminish competition and perhaps to lower unrealistic expectations. Wage freezes and the rationing of both staples and scarce consumer goods in cities attempted to diminish stratification and hence competition. The focusing of attention on the sufferings and egalitarian communal traditions of the past, which was so prominent in Maoist rhetoric and replaced the future orientation of the 1950s, in part diverted attention from frustrations with the present. Tensions were most acute within the education system, which served, as it does in most societies, to sort children and select those who would go on to managerial and professional jobs. It was for this reason that the Cultural Revolution focused so negatively on the education system. Because of the rising competition in the schools and for the jobs to which schooling could lead, it became increasingly evident that those who did best in school were the children of the "bourgeoisie" and urban professional groups rather than the children of workers and peasants (see Education in the People's Republic of China).

Cultural Revolution-era policies responded with public deprecation of schooling and expertise, including closing of all schools for a year or more and of universities for nearly a decade, exaltation of on-the-job training and of political motivation over expertise, and preferential treatment for workers and peasant youth. Educated urban youth, most of whom came from "bourgeois" families, were persuaded or coerced to settle in the countryside, often in remote frontier districts. Because there were no jobs in the cities, the party expected urban youth to apply their education in the countryside as primary school teachers, production team accountants, or barefoot doctors; many did manual labor. The policy was intensely unpopular, not only with urban parents and youth but also with peasants and was dropped soon after the fall of the Gang of Four in late 1976. During the late 1970s and early 1980s, many of the youth who had been sent down to the countryside managed to make their way back to the cities, where they had neither jobs nor ration books. By the mid-1980s most of them had found jobs in the newly expanded service sector.

In terms of creating jobs and mollifying urban parents, the 1980s policies on urban employment have been quite successful. The jobs in many cases are not the sort that educated young people or their parents would choose, but they are considerably better than a lifelong assignment to remote frontier areas.

The Maoist policies on education and job assignment were successful in preventing a great many urban "bourgeois" parents from passing their favored social status on to their children. This reform, however, came at great cost to the economy and to the prestige and authority of the party itself.

Examinations, hereditary transmission of jobs, and connections
Beginning in the late 1970s, China's leaders stressed expertise and education over motivation and ideology and consequently placed emphasis again on examinations. Competition in the schools was explicit, and examinations were frequent. A major step in the competition for desirable jobs was the passage from senior middle school to college and university, and success was determined by performance on a nationwide college and university entrance examination (see National College Entrance Examination). Examinations also were used to select applicants for jobs in factories, and even factory managers had to pass examinations to keep their positions. The content of these examinations has not been made public, but their use represents a logical response to the problem of unfair competition, favoritism, and corruption.

One extreme form of selection by favoritism in the 1980s was simple hereditary transmission, and this principle, which operated on a de facto basis in rural work units, seems to have been fairly widely used in China's industrial sector. From the 1960s to the 1980s, factories and mines in many cases permitted children to replace their parents in jobs, which simplified recruitment and was an effective way of encouraging aging workers to retire. The government forbade this practice in the 1980s, but in some instances state-run factories and mines, especially those located in rural or remote areas, used their resources to set up subsidiaries or sideline enterprises to provide employment for their workers' children. The leaders of these work units evidently felt responsible for providing employment to the children of unit members. Jobs are also transmitted through other relatives or their friends, with accordance to the complex Chinese social concept of guanxi.

The party and its role in personnel matters, including job assignments, can be an obstacle to the consistent application of hiring standards. At the grass-roots level, the party branch's control of job assignments and promotions is one of the foundations of its power, and some local party cadres in the mid-1980s apparently viewed the expanded use of examinations and educational qualifications as a threat to their power. The party, acting through local employment commissions, controlled all job assignments. Party members occupied the most powerful and desirable positions; the way party members were evaluated and selected for positions remained obscure. Local party cadres were frequently suspected by the authorities of using their connections to secure jobs for their relatives or clients.

See also
List of cities in China
Urbanization in China
Urban Planning in China
Rural society in the People's Republic of China
Public health in the People's Republic of China
Economy of China

References
 

 "中国城市年鉴" "Yearbook of Chinese Cities" (formerly known as "Yearbook of China's urban economy and society"), approved by the State Press and Publication Administration founded in 1985, Chinese Academy of Social Sciences in charge of China's Urban Development Studies Association.

External links
China Urban Research Network 
Center for Modern Chinese City Studies, East China Normal University
Modern Urban Research
Ministry of Housing Urban-Rural Development
China Urban Development Network
China Academy of Urban Construction
China Academy of Urban Planning and Design
China Urban Institute
China Academy of Urban Development
China Academy of Urban Planning and Design-Shenzhen
Institute for Urban Development
China Urban Management Exchange Network
China City Innovation Forum - Peking University
Institute of Urban Environment, Chinese Academy of Sciences

Society of China
China